The John W. Christian Greenbelt is a stretch of green land in northern Sunnyvale, California.

Location

History
It was created under the name Hetch Hetchy Greenbelt in the mid-1970s as an asphalt track for pedestrians and bicycles, and part of it was improved by a landscape beautification project. Between 1994 and 2001 the landscaping was completed.

Renaming
On June 10, 2002, it was renamed after John W. Christian, who initiated the second phase of the landscaping as Parks and Recreation Director, but died in 1996 before it was finished. The land is owned by the San Francisco Public Utilities Commission, leased out to the city of Sunnyvale.

References

Sunnyvale, California
Bike paths in the San Francisco Bay Area
Protected areas of Santa Clara County, California